

86001–86100 

|-id=043
| 86043 Cévennes || 1999 OE || Cévennes National Park, southern France, where the discovering Pises Observatory is located || 
|}

86101–86200 

|-id=196
| 86196 Specula ||  || "Specula" is the old name for the Observatory of Eger (University), built in 1774 by count/bishop Károly Eszterházy, after whom the Eszterházy Károly University is named. The observatory is now a museum. || 
|}

86201–86300 

|-id=279
| 86279 Brucegary ||  || Bruce L. Gary (born 1939), an American astronomer and member of the Huachuca Astronomy Club, who has retired from the Jet Propulsion Laboratory, where he specialized in lunar radio astronomy. He is currently noted for his contributions to amateur-professional collaboration in photometry of variable stars, comets and minor planets and owns the Hereford Arizona Observatory  (Src). || 
|}

86301–86400 

|-bgcolor=#f2f2f2
| colspan=4 align=center | 
|}

86401–86500 

|-bgcolor=#f2f2f2
| colspan=4 align=center | 
|}

86501–86600 

|-id=551
| 86551 Seth ||  || Seth James Brady (born 1994) is the son of New Zealand astronomer Nigel Brady who discovered this minor planet. || 
|}

86601–86700 

|-bgcolor=#f2f2f2
| colspan=4 align=center | 
|}

86701–86800 

|-bgcolor=#f2f2f2
| colspan=4 align=center | 
|}

86801–86900 

|-bgcolor=#f2f2f2
| colspan=4 align=center | 
|}

86901–87000 

|-bgcolor=#f2f2f2
| colspan=4 align=center | 
|}

References 

086001-087000